The Great South Land Saga was a series of 12 novels by E. V. Timms and his wife Alma.

From the beginning, Timms envisioned a 12-part series of novels. However he died while writing the eleventh and his wife took over the completion of that. She then wrote the last novel on her own.

By the late 1970s it was estimated over 850,000 copies of the novels had been sold.

Novels
Forever to Remain (1948)
The Pathway of the Sun (1949)
The Beckoning Shore (1950)
The Valleys Beyond (1951)
 The Challenge (1952)
The Scarlet Frontier (1953)
The Fury (1954)
They Came from the Sea (1955)
Shining Harvest (1956)
Robina (1958)
The Big Country (1962)
Time and Chance (1971) – by Alma Timms

References

20th-century Australian novels